Crosley-class high speed transports were high speed transport ships that served in the United States Navy during World War II. Some stayed in commission long enough to serve in the Korean War and the Vietnam War. After World War II ended, several of the ships were sold to Mexico, South Korea, Taiwan, and Colombia.

Today, ARC Cordoba (DT-15), formerly  is the only surviving member of the class, preserved as a museum ship in Tocancipa, Colombia.

Ships in class

References
Navsource: High-speed Transport (APD) Amphibious Transport, Small (LPR) Photo Index
High speed transports: Crosley class

External links

 

 
Auxiliary ship classes of the United States Navy
Crosley class high speed transport
Crosley class high speed transport
Crosley class high speed transport
Auxiliary transport ship classes